CBGB was a New York City music club opened in 1973 by Hilly Kristal in Manhattan's East Village. The club was previously a biker bar and before that was a dive bar. The letters CBGB were for Country, BlueGrass, and Blues, Kristal's original vision, yet CBGB soon became a famed venue of punk rock and new wave bands like Ramones, Television, Patti Smith Group, Blondie, and Talking Heads.  From the early 1980s onward, CBGB was known for hardcore punk.

One storefront beside CBGB became the "CBGB Record Canteen", a record shop and café. In the late 1980s, "CBGB Record Canteen" was converted into an art gallery and second performance space, "CB's 313 Gallery". CB's Gallery was played by music artists of milder sounds, such as acoustic rock, folk, jazz, or experimental music, such as Dadadah, Kristeen Young and Toshi Reagon, while CBGB continued to showcase mainly hardcore punk, post punk, metal, and alternative rock. 313 Gallery was also the host location for Alchemy, a weekly Goth night showcasing goth, industrial, dark rock, and darkwave bands. On the other side, CBGB was operating a small cafe and bar in the mid-1990s, which served classic New York pizza, among other items.

Around 2000, CBGB entered a protracted dispute over allegedly unpaid rent amounts until the landlord, Bowery Residents' Committee, sued in 2005 and lost the case, but a deal to renew CBGB's lease, expiring in 2006, failed.  The club closed upon its final concert, played by Patti Smith, on October 15, 2006.  CBGB Radio launched on the iHeartRadio platform in 2010, and CBGB music festivals began in 2012.  In 2013, CBGB's onetime building, 315 Bowery, was added to the National Register of Historic Places as part of The Bowery Historic District (not a New York City Historic District).

Founding
CBGB was founded on December 10, 1973, on the site of Kristal's earlier bar, Hilly's on the Bowery, that he ran from 1969 to 1972. Initially, Kristal focused on his more profitable East Village nightspot, Hilly's, which Kristal closed amid complaints from the bar's neighbors. After Hilly's closure, Kristal focused on the Bowery club. Its full name of CBGB & OMFUG stands for "Country, Bluegrass, Blues and Other Music for Uplifting Gormandizers." Although a gormandizer is usually a ravenous eater of food, what Kristal meant was "a voracious eater of (…) music." Kristal's intended theme of country, bluegrass, and blues music along with poetry readings yielded to the American movement in punk rock. A pioneer in the genre, Ramones played their first shows at CBGB.

Evolution
 
In 1973, while the future CBGB was still Hilly's, two locals—Bill Page and Rusty McKenna—convinced Kristal to let them book concerts. In February 1974, Hilly booked local band Squeeze to a residency, playing Tuesdays and Wednesdays, the club's change from country and bluegrass to original rock bands.  Squeeze was led by guitarist Mark Suall, later with CBGB's quasi house band the Revelons, which included Fred Smith of Television and JD Daugherty of the Patti Smith Group.  Although these bands did not play punk rock, they helped lay its foundation.  The August 1973 collapse of the Mercer Arts Center left unsigned bands little option in New York City to play original music.  Mercer refugees—including Suicide, The Fast, Ruby and the Rednecks, Wayne County, and the Magic Tramps—soon played at CBGB.

In 1974, on April 14, in the audience of Television's third gig were Patti Smith and Lenny Kaye, whose Patti Smith Group debuted at CBGB on February 14, 1975. Other early performers included the Dina Regine Band. Dennis Lepri was lead guitarist as well as the Stillettoes which included Deborah Harry on vocals. The newly formed band Angel and the Snake, later renamed Blondie, as well as Ramones arrived in August 1974. Mink DeVille, Talking Heads, the Shirts, the Heartbreakers, the Fleshtones and other bands soon followed. In April 1977, The Damned played the club, marking the first time a British punk band had ever played in America.

During 1975 and 1976, Metropolis Video recorded some shows on film. Starting in 1977, Metropolis Video filmmaker Pat Ivers and partner Emily Armstrong continued to record shows in a project called Advanced TV, later renamed GoNightclubbing. Ivers' and Armstrong's films are available at the New York University Fales Library.

CBGB's two rules were that a band must move its own equipment and play mostly original songs—that is, no cover bands—although regular bands often played one or two covers in set.  CBGB's growing reputation drew more and more acts from outside New York City.  In 1978, new wave songwriter Elvis Costello would open shows for The Voidoids, while The Police played at CBGB for their first American gigs.  Meanwhile, CBGB became famed for Misfits, Television, Patti Smith Group, Mink DeVille, the Dead Boys, the Dictators, the Fleshtones, the Voidoids, the Cramps, the B-52's, Blondie, Joan Jett & the Blackhearts, the Shirts, and Talking Heads.  Yet in the 1980s, hardcore punk's New York underground was CBGB's mainstay.  Named "thrash day" in a documentary on hardcore, Sunday at CBGB was matinée day, which became an institution, played from afternoon until evening by hardcore bands such as Reagan Youth, Bad Brains, Beastie Boys, Agnostic Front, Murphy's Law, Cro-Mags, Leeway, Warzone, Gorilla Biscuits, Sick of It All, Misfits, Sheer Terror, Stillborn and Youth of Today.  In 1990, violence inside and outside of the venue prompted Kristal to suspend hardcore bookings, although CBGB brought hardcore back at times.  CBGB's last several years had no formal bans by genre.

Rent controversy

In 2005, atop its normally paid monthly rent of $19,000, CBGB was sued for some $90,000 in rent allegedly owed to its landlord, Bowery Residents' Committee (BRC).  Refusing to pay until a judge ruled the debt legitimate, Kristal claimed that he had never been notified of scaled rent increases, accruing over a number of years, asserted by BRC's executive director Muzzy Rosenblatt.  Ruling the debt false—that BRC had never properly billed the rent increases—the judge indicated that CBGB ought to be declared a landmark, but noted that Rosenblatt did not need to renew the lease, soon expiring.  Rosenblatt vowed to appeal.

Expecting Rosenblatt's resistance to lease negotiation, Kristal agreed that the rent ought to rise, but not to the $55,000 monthly that Kristal believed the BRC to want.  A nonprofit corporation housing homeless above CBGB mostly through donations and government funding, the BRC had only one commercial tenant and raised its monthly rent to $35,000.  Kristal and the BRC reached an agreement whereby CBGB would leave by September 30, 2006.  Planning to move CBGB to Las Vegas, Kristal explained, "We're going to take the urinals.  I'll take whatever I can.  The movers said, 'You ought to take everything, and auction off what you don't want on eBay.' Why not?  Somebody will."

Closure
 
Many punk rock bands played at CBGB when they found it was going to close in hopes that their support could keep it from closing. Rocks Off, a promoter in New York, organized CBGB's final weeks of shows to book "many of the artists who made CB's famous." Avail, the Bouncing Souls, and such newer acts opened during the last week, which included multi-night stands by Bad Brains and the Dictators and an acoustic set by Blondie.  The final show, broadcast live on Sirius Satellite Radio on October 15, was played by Patti Smith, helped on some songs by Flea of the Red Hot Chili Peppers. Television's Richard Lloyd, too, played in a few, including "Marquee Moon".  Nearly finished, Smith and band playing "Gloria" alternated the chorus with echos of "Blitzkrieg Bop"—by the Ramones—Hey! Ho! Let's go!.  During "Elegie",  her final encore, Smith named musicians and other music figures who had died since playing at CBGB.  On October 15, 2006, upon Patti Smith's last show at CBGB, the storied bar and club closed.

Aftermath
After closing, the old CBGB venue remained open as CBGB Fashions—retail store, wholesale department, and an online store—until October 31, 2006.  CBGB Fashions moved to 19–23 St. Mark's Place on November 1, and closed nearly two years later in summer 2008.

Hilly Kristal died from complications of lung cancer on August 28, 2007. In early October, Kristal's family and friends hosted a private memorial service in the nearby YMCA.  Soon, there was a public memorial, contributed to by CBGB onetime staff and by others.

Kristal's ex-wife Karen Kristal and his daughter, Lisa Kristal Burgman, battled legally over the purported $3 million CBGB estate, and settled in June 2009 with Burgman receiving most of the money left after payment of creditors and estate taxes.  In 2011, a group of unknown investors bought the remaining CBGB assets, including the associated intellectual property and original interior. The location is now occupied by John Varvatos fashions.

In December 2015, various news outlets reported on a rebranded CBGB "reopening" at Newark International Airport - as CBGB L.A.B. (Lounge and Bar) by New York Chef chef Harold Moore; which had opened as of the end of December 2015.

Venue

By late 2007, fashion designer John Varvatos planned to open a store in CBGB's former space, 315 Bowery, but to tastefully trail CBGB's legacy rock and roll stickers on the walls, and much of the graffiti at the toilets was preserved, as were some playbills, found behind a wall, from shows at the club's 10th anniversary in 1983. The store opened in April 2008.

In 2008, a SoHo art gallery dedicated to music photography, the Morrison Hotel, opened a second location in the onetime CBGB Gallery at 313 Bowery, but the Morrison Hotel gallery closed in 2011. The space was then occupied by a surf-oriented Patagonia store until late 2021.

Called the "Extra Place", the alley behind the building became a pedestrian mall. The Dead Boys' Cheetah Chrome rued, "All of Manhattan has lost its soul to money lords", yet reflected, "If that alley could talk, it's seen it all". CBGB's nomination as a landmark drew an explanation:

Today visitors can see etched into the cement at the entrance to the clothing store, the name of the music venue and the date it was founded "CBGB '73". People often stop and take pictures of the inscription as well as the facade of the store.

Influence
CBGB's second awning, the one in place when the club closed in 2006, was moved into the lobby of the Rock and Roll Hall of Fame in Cleveland.

The CBGB Festival produced large free concerts in Times Square and Central Park on July 7, 2012. They also showcased hundreds of bands in venues across the city. The festival premiered dozens of rock-n-roll movies in theaters around Manhattan.

Directed by Randall Miller and starring Alan Rickman as Hilly Kristal, the film CBGB, about Kristal and the origins of the club, was released in October 2013 to harsh reviews.  Iconic in American popular culture, CBGB's image remained storied:
 CBGB was in a promotional ad aired during New York City's bid to host the  2012 Olympic Games.
 CBGB appears in the 2010 rhythm game Guitar Hero: Warriors of Rock.
 In The Shapers' song "Old School Punk Star", the venue is referenced in the bridge: "...And to rock on at the CBGB ..."
 Rapper Aesop Rock mentions CBGB in his song "Shrunk", "Telephone uncovered by purveyors of the Ouija/Then checked against the CBGB women's room graffiti"
 Talking Heads mention CBGB in the song ""Life During Wartime", "This ain't no Mudd Club, or C.B.G.B"
 LCD Soundsystem's 2002 debut single "Losing My Edge" references CBGB, "I was the first guy playing Daft Punk to the rock kids. I played it at CBGB's. Everybody thought I was crazy."

See also
 Max's Kansas City
 Punk rock
 New wave music

Notes

Sources
 Beeber, Steven. The Heebie-Jeebies at CBGB's: A Secret History of Jewish Punk.  Chicago: Chicago Review Press, 2006. .
 Brazis, Tamar (ed.). CBGB & OMFUG: Thirty Years from the Home of Underground Rock (1st ed.). New York: Harry N. Abrams, Inc., Publishers, 2005. .
 Heylin, Clinton. From the Velvets to the Voidoids (2nd ed.). Eastbourne, East Sussex: Gardners Books, 2005. .
 Kozak, Roman. This Ain't No Disco: The Story of CBGB. Boston: Faber and Faber, 1988. .

External links

  – official site
 
 Between Punk Rock and a Hard Place article in New York Magazine
 CBGB Takes Final Bow Before Eviction on WCBS TV

1973 establishments in New York City
2006 disestablishments in New York (state)
Former music venues in New York City
Bowery
New wave music
Cultural history of New York City
Nightclubs in Manhattan
Punk rock venues
Event venues on the National Register of Historic Places in New York City
Music venues in Manhattan
Historic district contributing properties in Manhattan